Bap (Baap) also known as Bhap is a village, located in the Jodhpur District of Rajasthan state in Western India. It is nearby Jodhpur city. It is a Panchayat Samiti as well as being the Tehsil headquarters for Bap Tehsil. It is a rapidly developing village.

History
Prior to becoming the headquarters of the then newly created Bap Tehsil in 2011, Bap was part of Phalodi Tehsil; but was still the center for the local area with a local council (panchayat samiti), which was treated as an independent Sub-Tehsil.
Bap village is also very religious place. Madhuri Dixit and Huma Qureshi also came to this village for shooting their movie Dedh Ishqiya.

Demographics
In the Census of India 2001, the village of Bap had a population of 8,890. Males constituted 4,717 of the population and females 4,173. The gender ratio is 885 females per thousand males.

Notes

Villages in Jodhpur district